Scott Wilson Group plc was a global integrated design and engineering consultancy with its headquarters in the United Kingdom. Founded as a civil engineering firm in 1951, the company broadened its range of services through acquisitions. Scott Wilson offered consultancy and professional services in the railways, buildings and infrastructure, environment and natural resources and roads sectors, and at its peak employed 5,500 people in 80 offices worldwide. Scott Wilson became a public limited company in 2006, and in 2010 was purchased by URS Corporation that in turn was purchased by AECOM.

History 
Sir Cyril Kirkpatrick (1872–1957) was Chief Engineer to the Port of London Authority from 1913 to 1924, when he established his own firm specialising in docks, harbours and sea defences. During World War II, Kirkpatrick advised on the construction of the concrete caissons which formed the Mulberry Harbour that facilitated the D-Day landings. In 1945 engineers William Scott and Dr Guthlac Wilson founded a partnership. Between them they were responsible for the design of the Chiswick and Twickenham Bridges over the River Thames in 1933, and the Royal Festival Hall in London. The two firms merged in 1951, forming Scott & Wilson, Kirkpatrick & Partners.

In the late 1960s Scott Wilson Kirkpatrick & Partners was responsible for engineering works on the M6 motorway through the Lune Gorge in north-west England. The firm grew through acquisitions over the following decades. In August 1995 the company purchased two British Rail engineering design offices in Glasgow and Swindon during the privatisation of British Rail. Other acquisitions were in the fields of environmental consultancy, health and education property, power and mining, landscape design and engineering.

In 1997 the firm adopted the name Scott Wilson, and it floated on the London Stock Exchange on 15 March 2006. The company acquired the civil engineering specialist Benaim Enterprise in 2008 for £5.5 million.

On 10 September 2010, American engineering design firm URS Corporation completed its acquisition of Scott Wilson Group plc. Scott Wilson Group plc is no longer listed in the London Stock Exchange. Scott Wilson rebranded initially as URS-Scott Wilson, though the Scott Wilson name was dropped in the UK, Ireland, Europe and the Middle East in 2012, and in India in 2013.

At the time of the acquisition, Scott Wilson Group had 5,500 employees in 80 offices, mainly located in the UK, Europe, India, the Asia-Pacific region, and the Middle East. The group's regional main offices were in London, Hong Kong, Warsaw, New Delhi, Bahrain and Dubai.

Projects 

Scott Wilson Group was involved in a large number of high-profile engineering projects worldwide.

 Crossrail, London, UK
 Combe Down Mine Stabilisation, Somerset, UK
 Spinnaker Tower, Portsmouth, UK
 Eden Project, Cornwall, UK
 Waverley Line reopening, Scotland, UK
 S69 Expressway, Poland
 Central and Ionia Odos motorways, Greece
 Sheremetyevo Airport Masterplan, Russia 
 Erbil International Airport, Iraq 
 Delhi Mumbai Industrial Corridor, India
 Colombo Port expansion, Sri Lanka 
 Wuxi Integrated Transportation Hub, China
 Nam Theun 2 Dam hydroelectric project, Laos
 Brunei International Airport, Brunei
 Interstate 595 improvements, Florida, USA
 Napier Mole Road Bridge (Jinnah Bridge), Karachi
Hong Kong
 Airport Core Programme (ACP), Hong Kong
 Cross-Harbour Tunnel, Hong Kong
 Kai Tak Airport, Hong Kong
 Lai Chi Kok Bridge, Hong Kong
 Liu To Bridge Hong Kong
 MTR South Island line, Hong Kong
 Plover Cove Reservoir, Hong Kong
 Tsing Yi North Bridge, Hong Kong
 Tsuen Wan New Town, Hong Kong
 Tuen Mun New Town, Hong Kong
 Tuen Mun Road, Hong Kong

References

External links 
 

Companies formerly listed on the London Stock Exchange
Defunct engineering companies of England
Design companies established in 1951
Design companies disestablished in 2010
1951 establishments in England
2010 disestablishments in England